Reed Henderson (born c. 1935) was a Canadian football player who played for the Edmonton Eskimos. He won the Grey Cup with the Eskimos in 1956. He attended Utah State University.

References

1930s births
Living people
Edmonton Elks players